Sand eel or sandeel is the common name used for a considerable number of species of fish. Many species are found off the western coasts of Europe from Spain to Scotland, and in the Mediterranean and Baltic seas.

Sand eels are an important food source for seabirds, including puffins and kittiwakes. They are a commercially important for the production of fish meal and made up 4% of fish globally caught for fish meal production (behind anchovy, capelin and blue whiting) between 1997 and 2001.

Habitat
The preferential habitat for sand eels is a seabed floor, with a relatively smooth bottom of gravelly sand; an example of this prime habitat is the floor of the Sea of the Hebrides.

Sand eel species
Most sand eels are sea fish of the genera Hyperoplus (greater sand eels), Gymnammodytes or Ammodytes. The three genera listed above all fall within the family Ammodytidae, the sand lances.  Members of these genera found in other oceans are not usually called sand eels, and species from other parts of the world which are known as sand eels are usually less closely related.

Commercial fishing
Traditionally, they have been little exploited for human food, but are a major target of industrial fishing for animal feed and fertilizer. Increasing fishing for them is thought to be causing problems for some of their natural predators, especially the auks which take them in deeper water.  They are also tied as flies to catch fish.

An instance of this was the RSPB report linking a population crash of seabirds in the North Sea to fishing for sand eels. This led to political pressure for the closure of this fishery; the seabird populations subsequently improved.

See also
Environmental effects of fishing

References

Fish common names